CAS Corporation is a Korean manufacturer of electronic weighing equipment, founded on April 19, 1983 by its current Chief Executive Manager, Dong-Jin Kim.

CAS has been continuously developing over the years and by 2006, its equipment was exported to over 120 countries. By 2011, the company had representatives in Germany, USA, Canada, Poland, Vietnam, Bangladesh, India, China, Japan, Russia, Turkey, Great Britain and other countries. Its equipment has been certified and approved for commercial use, among others, in USA, Canada, Russia, European Union (OIML), Australia, Japan.

CAS was the first Korean company to export electronic scales in 1987 and to develop a label printing scale in 1992 (model LP, which was an abbreviation for label printing).

References

External links
Official Website
Vehicle Scales 

Weighing scale manufacturers
Manufacturing companies of South Korea
Companies based in Seoul
Manufacturing companies established in 1983
South Korean brands
South Korean companies established in 1983